John of Tella (or John Bar Qursos) (483–538) was a monk and bishop in the Near East.  John was a major proponent of moderate Miaphysitism. Although his native language was Syriac he studied Greek in order to serve in the Byzantine administration.  John was a native of Callinicus.  He was influenced to become a monk by reading the Acts of Thecla.  He later studied at the monastery founded by Gregory Nazianzen.

John served as bishop of Tella which is near the modern city of Aleppo.  John became bishop in 519.  He has also come down to us as an opponent of inept, rich men gaining priestly office through bribes.  In 521 John resigned his office as a bishop so he could better pursue the ascetic life.  Still his most lasting contribution was ordaining many priests and bishops in opposition to the Chalcedonians moving the break between them and the Monophysites to a full blown schism.

Sources

See the life of John of Tella in Brooks, Vitae virorum apud Monophysitas celeberrimorum (1907) https://books.google.com/books?id=AR8YAAAAYAAJ

Brown, Peter. The Rise of Western Christendom, (Malden: Blackwell Publishing, 2003) p. 311

6th-century Byzantine monks
6th-century Syrian bishops
483 births
538 deaths